Let's Fall in Love is a 1933 American pre-Code romantic musical film starring Edmund Lowe and Ann Sothern. Released by Columbia Pictures, the film was directed by David Burton and written by Herbert Fields.

The songs Let's Fall in Love (not to be confused with the Cole Porter song sometimes called Let's Do It, Let's Fall in Love) and  Love Is Love Anywhere  were introduced by Ann Sothern in this film.

The film was later remade in 1949 by Douglas Sirk as Slightly French, starring Don Ameche and Dorothy Lamour.

Plot
A Hollywood director (Edmund Lowe) finds himself in trouble when his latest Swedish discovery departs the shooting of his film. He finds the perfect candidate in a girl working at a fair (Ann Sothern). The only problem is, she is not in fact Swedish; a minor detail but one that can be sorted by deft handiwork and a bit of pretence.

Cast
 Edmund Lowe as Ken
 Ann Sothern as Jean
 Miriam Jordan as Gerry
 Gregory Ratoff as Max
 Greta Meyer as Lisa
 Betty Furness as Linda
 John Qualen as Svente Bjorkman (uncredited)

External links

 
 
 
 

1933 films
1930s romantic musical films
American romantic musical films
American black-and-white films
Columbia Pictures films
1930s English-language films
1930s American films